Mariam Nazarian (born 1983) a.k.a. Marie Nazar is a concert pianist and producer; she is a graduate of the Mannes College of Music, Harvard University, and University of Cambridge (Clare Hall). Nazarian has performed at Carnegie Hall (New York), Symphony Hall (Boston), and the Grand Philharmonic Hall (St. Petersburg, Russia). She has recorded a commercially released CD of J.S. Bach's Goldberg Variations.

Early life
Nazarian grew up in Plainsboro Township, New Jersey and attended West Windsor-Plainsboro High School North for her freshman and sophomore years, before being home-schooled for the remainder of high school years to avoid conflicts with her professional performing career.

References

External links
Marie Nazar (Piano) - Short Biography

Living people
1983 births
Harvard University alumni
Mannes School of Music alumni
Musicians from New Jersey
People from Plainsboro Township, New Jersey
21st-century American women pianists
21st-century American pianists